The 2006 Family Circle Cup was the 34th edition of the Family Circle Cup women's tennis tournament.  This WTA Tier I event was held at the Family Circle Tennis Center in Charleston, South Carolina, United States and played on outdoor clay courts. Nadia Petrova won the singles title.

Finals

Singles

 Nadia Petrova defeated  Patty Schnyder, 6–3, 4–6, 6–1

Doubles

 Lisa Raymond /  Samantha Stosur defeated  Virginia Ruano Pascual /  Meghann Shaughnessy, 3–6, 6–1, 6–1

External links
 ITF tournament edition details

Family Circle Cup
Charleston Open
Family Circle Cup
Family Circle Cup
Family Circle Cup